This is a list of the Australian moth species of the family Lasiocampidae. It also acts as an index to the species articles and forms part of the full List of moths of Australia.

Gastropachinae
Pernattia brevipennis (Walker, 1865)
Pernattia chlorophragma (Turner, 1924)
Pernattia pusilla (Donovan, 1805)

Lasiocampinae
Anastrolos apasta (Turner, 1924)
Anastrolos holopolia (Turner, 1924)
Anastrolos porphyrica (Turner, 1941)
Anastrolos zoristis (Turner, 1924)
Cyclophragma centralistrigata (Bethune-Baker, 1904)
Cyclophragma cyclomela (Lower, 1903)
Entometa apicalis (Walker, 1855)
Entometa chlorosacca Turner, 1924
Entometa decorata (Walker, 1865)
Entometa erubescens (Lower, 1894)
Entometa fervens (Walker, 1855)
Entometa guerinii (Le Guillou, 1841)
Entometa guttularis (Walker, 1855)
Eremaea coralliphora (Lower, 1900)
Eremaea zonospila (Lower, 1893)
Genduara acedesta (Turner, 1911)
Genduara albicans (Swinhoe, 1892)
Genduara contermina (Walker, 1865)
Genduara dianipha (Turner, 1911)
Genduara fola (Swinhoe, 1902)
Genduara macqueeni (Turner, 1936)
Genduara macroptila (Turner, 1911)
Genduara pinnalis (T.P. Lucas, 1895)
Genduara punctigera (Walker, 1855)
Genduara rhoda (Swinhoe, 1902)
Genduara subnotata (Walker, 1869)
Neurochyta agrapta (Turner, 1936)
Neurochyta edna (Swinhoe, 1902)
Opsirhina albigutta Walker, 1855
Opsirhina alphaea (Fabricius, 1775)
Opsirhina lechriodes (Turner, 1911)
Pararguda albida (Walker, 1865)
Pararguda australasiae (Fabricius, 1775)
Pararguda crenulata (T.P. Lucas, 1894)
Pararguda crocota (Turner, 1911)
Pararguda dasymalla (Turner, 1924)
Pararguda diamphidia (Turner, 1936)
Pararguda ecnoma (Turner, 1924)
Pararguda nana (Walker, 1855)
Pararguda nasuta (Lewin, 1805)
Pararguda nigriventris (Walker, 1862)
Pararguda rufescens (Walker, 1855)
Pararguda spodopa (Turner, 1904)
Pararguda tephropsis (Turner, 1924)
Pinara cana Walker, 1855
Pinara divisa (Walker, 1855)
Pinara metaphaea (Walker, 1862)
Pinara obliqua (Walker, 1855)
Pinara rufescens Butler, 1886
Pinara sesioides (Walker, 1866)
Porela albifinis (Walker, 1855)
Porela amathodes Turner, 1924
Porela ceraunias Turner, 1942
Porela cinerea (Boisduval, 1832)
Porela delineata (Walker, 1855)
Porela euthyerges Turner, 1941
Porela galactodes (Lower, 1893)
Porela homospila Turner, 1924
Porela notabilis (Walker, 1855)
Porela notodontina (R. Felder, 1874)
Porela obtusa (Walker, 1865)
Porela rhabditis (Turner, 1932)
Porela subfasciata (Walker, 1855)
Porela vetusta Walker, 1855
Porela vitulina (Donovan, 1805)
Symphyta colpodes Turner, 1924
Symphyta nephelodes (Turner, 1924)
Symphyta nyctopis Turner, 1902
Symphyta oxygramma (Lower, 1902)
Symphyta psaropis Turner, 1902

External links 
Lasiocampidae at Australian Faunal Directory
Lasiocampidae at lepidoptera.butterflyhouse

Australia